Eastmoreland Golf Course is a golf course in southeast Portland, Oregon. Designed by golf architect Chandler Egan, the course is the second oldest in Oregon, established in 1917, and was ranked among the top 25 public golf courses in the United States by Golf Digest in the early 1990s. It hosted the U.S. Amateur Public Links in 1933 and 1990.

References

External links
 
 
 Eastmoreland Golf Course, Portland Parks & Recreation

1917 establishments in Oregon
Golf clubs and courses in Oregon
Southeast Portland, Oregon
Sports venues in Portland, Oregon